Çalkuyucak is a village in the Çal District of Denizli Province in Turkey. It has an elevation of 792 meters (2,598 feet ). The village is located close to Bahadırlar and Çoğaşli.

References

Villages in Çal District